Low Pop Suicide was an indie rock band of the early 1990s on World Domination Recordings.

History
Dave Allen (Gang of Four and Shriekback), Rick Boston and Jeff Ward founded the band in Los Angeles.
Rick Boston sang and played guitar, Dave Allen, founder of the record label World Domination Recordings, played bass and Jeff Ward was on drums.  Ward left the group after the recording of their debut album, On the Cross of Commerce. He committed suicide in 1993, dying of carbon monoxide poisoning. He was replaced by Melle Steagal.
Jessy Greene of the Geraldine Fibbers contributed some violin. 
The soundtrack to the thriller The Harvest can be considered a Low Pop Suicide side project.

Discography

LPs
 On the Cross of Commerce (1993)
 The Death of Excellence (1994)

Singles & EPs
 The Disengagement (1992)
 Kiss Your Lips (1993)
 Unzipped EP (1995)

Side Project
 The Harvest (1996 - Soundtrack - World Domination Recording)

Personnel
 Dave Allen (bass)
 Jeff Ward (drums)
 Melle Steagal (drums)
 Mark Leonard (bass)
 Rick Boston (vocals, guitar)

External links
 Somewhere Nice to Fall
 The Shriekback Pages discography
 Misfits Central discography
 Critical TrouserPress essay

References

Indie rock musical groups from California
Musical groups from Los Angeles